The 2022 Union Omaha season was the third season in the soccer team's history, and their third season in the third division of American soccer, USL League One. Union Omaha played their home games at Werner Park, located in Papillion, Nebraska, United States.

Union Omaha were the defending league champions, after defeating Greenville Triumph SC in the final the previous season.  They also competed in the U.S. Open Cup for the first time, defeating two teams from Major League Soccer and reaching the quarterfinals, the farthest a team from USL League One has advanced in the tournament since the formation of the league.

Transfers

Transfers in

Transfers out

Roster

In December 2021, Union Omaha announced an initial group of five players from last season's roster returning for the 2022 season.

Competitions

Exhibitions

USL League One

Standings

Results summary

Results by round

Match results

USL League One playoffs

U.S.Open Cup

Statistics

Appearances and goals

Numbers after plus–sign (+) denote appearances as a substitute.

Disciplinary record
{| class="wikitable" style="text-align:center;"
|-
| rowspan="2" !width=15|
| rowspan="2" !width=15|
| rowspan="2" !width=120|Player
| colspan="3"|USL1
| colspan="3"|US Open Cup
| colspan="3"|Total
|-
!width=34; background:#fe9;|
!width=34; background:#fe9;|
!width=34; background:#ff8888;|
!width=34; background:#fe9;|
!width=34; background:#fe9;|
!width=34; background:#ff8888;|
!width=34; background:#fe9;|
!width=34; background:#fe9;|
!width=34; background:#ff8888;|
|-
|| 2 || MF ||align=left|   Emir Alihodžić
|| 2 || 0 || 0 || 1 || 0 || 0 || 3 || 0 || 0
|-
|| 4 || DF ||align=left|  Alex Touche
|| 6 || 0 || 0 || 1 || 0 || 0 || 7 || 0 || 0
|-
|| 5 || DF ||align=left|  Gabriel Claudio
|| 4 || 1 || 0 || 1 || 0 || 0 || 5 || 1 || 0
|-
|| 6 || MF ||align=left|   Chavany Willis
|| 1 || 0 || 0 || 0 || 0 || 0 || 1 || 0 || 0
|-
|| 7 || FW ||align=left|  Noe Meza
|| 1 || 0 || 0 || 0 || 0 || 0 || 1 || 0 || 0
|-
|| 8 || MF ||align=left|  Joe Brito
|| 3 || 0 || 0 || 0 || 0 || 0 || 3 || 0 || 0
|-
|| 9 || FW ||align=left|  Corey Hertzog
|| 1 || 0 || 1 || 0 || 0 || 0 || 1 || 0 || 1
|-
|| 10 || FW ||align=left|  Hugo Kametani
|| 0 || 0 || 0 || 0 || 0 || 0 || 0 || 0 || 0
|-
|| 11 || FW ||align=left|  Kemal Malcolm
|| 4 || 0 || 0 || 0 || 0 || 0 || 4 || 0 || 0
|-
|| 12 || MF ||align=left|  Eddie Gordon
|| 1 || 0 || 0 || 0 || 0 || 0 || 1 || 0 || 0
|-
|| 13 || DF ||align=left|  Daltyn Knutson
|| 2 || 0 || 0 || 0 || 0 || 0 || 2 || 0 || 0
|-
|| 16 || FW ||align=left|  Alex Bruce
|| 4 || 0 || 0 || 0 || 0 || 0 || 4 || 0 || 0
|-
|| 17 || MF ||align=left|  JP Scearce
|| 5 || 1 || 0 || 0 || 0 || 0 || 5 || 1 || 0
|-
|| 19 || FW ||align=left|  Ricardo Rivera
|| 1 || 0 || 0 || 2 || 0 || 0 || 3 || 0 || 0
|-
|| 20 || MF ||align=left|  Luis Gil
|| 2 || 0 || 0 || 0 || 0 || 0 || 2 || 0 || 0
|-
|| 21 || DF ||align=left|  Isaac Bawa
|| 2 || 0 || 0 || 1 || 0 || 0 || 3 || 0 || 0
|-
|| 22 || MF ||align=left|  Conor Doyle
|| 5 || 0 || 0 || 1 || 0 || 0 || 6 || 0 || 0
|-
|| 23 || FW ||align=left|  Giovanni Montesdeoca
|| 0 || 0 || 0 || 0 || 0 || 0 || 0 || 0 || 0
|-
|| 24 || GK ||align=left|  Rashid Nuhu
|| 3 || 0 || 0 || 0 || 0 || 0 || 3 || 0 || 0
|-
|| 26 || MF ||align=left|  Dion Acoff
|| 0 || 0 || 0 || 0 || 0 || 0 || 0 || 0 || 0
|-
|| 27 || DF ||align=left|  Ryen Jiba
|| 5 || 0 || 0 || 0 || 0 || 0 || 5 || 0 || 0
|-
|| 28 || DF ||align=left|  Shaft Brewer Jr.
|| 1 || 0 || 0 || 0 || 0 || 0 || 1 || 0 || 0
|-
|| 30 || MF ||align=left|  Yoskar Galvan-Mercado
|| 3 || 0 || 0 || 0 || 0 || 0 || 3 || 0 || 0
|-
|| 33 || GK ||align=left|  Kevin Piedrahita
|| 3 || 0 || 0 || 0 || 0 || 0 || 3 || 0 || 0
|-
!colspan="3"|Total !! 42 !! 2 !! 0 !! 7 !! 0 !! 0 !! 46 !! 2 !! 0

Awards and Honors

USL League One All League First Team

USL League One End of Season Awards

References

2022 USL League One season
American soccer clubs 2022 season
2022 in sports in Nebraska